The  Philadelphia Soul season was the 6th season for the franchise in the Arena Football League. The team was coached by Mike Hohensee and played their home games at Wells Fargo Center. This was the first season for the Soul since they won ArenaBowl XXII in 2008, after the league went on hiatus in 2009 and the franchise was not active in 2010. The Soul finished the season 6–12, and missed the playoffs.

Standings

Regular season schedule
The Soul played in the first game of the 2011 AFL season on the road against the Pittsburgh Power on March 11. Their first home game of the season did not come until Week 6 against the Tampa Bay Storm on April 16. They hosted the Power in their final regular season game on July 22.

Regular season

Week 1: at Pittsburgh Power

Week 2: at Chicago Rush

Week 3: BYE

Week 4: at Milwaukee Mustangs

Week 5: at Orlando Predators

Week 6: vs. Tampa Bay Storm

Week 7: at San Jose SaberCats

Week 8: at Iowa Barnstormers

Week 9: vs. Jacksonville Sharks

Week 10: vs. Georgia Force

Week 11: at Cleveland Gladiators

Week 12: vs. New Orleans VooDoo

Week 13: vs. Milwaukee Mustangs

Week 14: at Spokane Shock

Week 15: vs. Tulsa Talons

Week 16: vs. Arizona Rattlers

Week 17: at Dallas Vigilantes

Week 18: vs. Cleveland Gladiators

Week 19: BYE

Week 20: vs. Pittsburgh Power

References

Philadelphia Soul
Philadelphia Soul seasons
Philadelphia Soul